Field Marshal Phin Choonhavan (August 14, 1891 – 26 January
1973) was a Thai military leader and Deputy Prime Minister of Thailand. Phin was a leader of several coups against the government, most notably the 1947 coup. During the Second World War, he commanded the Phayap Army's 3rd Division before being made military governor of the Shan States, which Thailand had occupied during the Burma Campaign.

Phin was the son of a Chinese physician, Kai who migrated to Siam from Chaoshan, as was the father of his wife, Lim Hong, who was also an immigrant from Shantou. His son, Chatichai Choonhavan, became Prime Minister of Thailand. His daughter, Udomlak, married Phao Sriyanond, director general of the Thai police. Another daughter, Charoen, married Pramarn Adireksarn, who served as deputy prime minister in several governments.

References

 Paul M. Handley, "The King Never Smiles" Yale University Press: 2006, 

Phin Choonhavan
Phin Choonhavan
1891 births
1973 deaths
Phin Choonhavan
Phin Choonhavan
Phin Choonhavan
Phin Choonhavan
Phin Choonhavan
Burma in World War II
Phin Choonhavan
Phin Choonhavan
Phin Choonhavan
Phin Choonhavan
Phin Choonhavan